Benjamin Wynn Fortson IV is an American linguist. Fortson IV received his B.A. from Yale University in 1989 and his PhD from Harvard University in 1996. He is Professor of Greek and Latin Language, Literature and Historical Linguistics at the University of Michigan College of Literature, Science, and the Arts. Fortson specializes in the comparative linguistic study of the Indo-European languages, focusing primarily on the Italic, Hellenic, Indo-Iranian, Anatolian, Celtic, and Germanic branches. He was for many years Senior Lexicographer of The American Heritage Dictionary of the English Language, and is the Editor-in-Chief of Beech Stave Press.

Selected bibliography
 Indo-European Language and Culture: An Introduction, 2004
 Language and Rhythm in Plautus. De Gruyter, 2008.

References

Indo-Europeanists
Linguists of Indo-European languages
Linguists from the United States
Living people
Harvard University alumni
Yale University alumni
University of Michigan faculty
Year of birth missing (living people)